Exallonyx is a genus of hymenopterans in the family Proctotrupidae. There are at least 20 described species in Exallonyx.

Species

 Exallonyx angulatus Townes, 1981 g
 Exallonyx ater (Gravenhorst, 1807) g
 Exallonyx brevicornis (Haliday, 1839) g
 Exallonyx brevimala Townes, 1981 g
 Exallonyx certus Townes, 1981 g
 Exallonyx chiuae Townes, 1981 g
 Exallonyx confusus (Nixon, 1938) g
 Exallonyx crenicornis (Nees, 1934) g
 Exallonyx formicarius Kieffer, 1904 g
 Exallonyx grandis Brues, 1919 b
 Exallonyx leviventris Kieffer, 1908 g
 Exallonyx ligatus (Nees, 1834) g
 Exallonyx longicornis (Nees, 1834) g
 Exallonyx microcerus Kieffer, 1908 g
 Exallonyx microstylus Kieffer, 1908 g
 Exallonyx minor Townes, 1981 g
 Exallonyx nixoni Townes, 1981 g
 Exallonyx pallidistigma Morley, 1922 g
 Exallonyx quadriceps (Ashmead, 1893) g
 Exallonyx subserratus Kieffer, 1908 g
 Exallonyx trichomus Townes, 1981 g
 Exallonyx trifoveatus Kieffer, 1908 c g
 Exallonyx wasmanni Kieffer, 1904 g

Data sources: i = ITIS, c = Catalogue of Life, g = GBIF, b = Bugguide.net

References

Further reading

External links

 

Proctotrupoidea
Hymenoptera genera
Parasitic wasps
Taxa named by Jean-Jacques Kieffer